Mecklenburg Investment Company Building is a historic commercial building located at Charlotte, Mecklenburg County, North Carolina. It was built in 1922, and is a three-story, three bay by six bay, red brick building. It measures 42 feet wide and 98 feet deep. The building is associated with the "New Negro" movement and is located in the historic African-American community of Brooklyn.

It was added to the National Register of Historic Places in 1982.

References

African-American history in Charlotte, North Carolina
Commercial buildings on the National Register of Historic Places in North Carolina
Commercial buildings completed in 1922
Buildings and structures in Charlotte, North Carolina
National Register of Historic Places in Mecklenburg County, North Carolina